Richard Liu Qiangdong (born March 10, 1973, or February 14, 1974) is a Chinese Internet entrepreneur. He has been called the "Jeff Bezos of China" and his company JD.com has been compared to Amazon due to its business model. Liu founded Jingdong as a business-to-consumer single retail store for magneto-optical products in June 1998 and later moved the company into an e-commerce website known as JD.com in 2004. Liu is the company's chief executive officer and expanded its e-commerce products from selling consumer electronics to less specialized items, which grew JD.com into one of the largest retailers in China. According to Forbes, Liu's net worth is US$9 billion as of May 2020 with a 15.8% stake in JD.com. He was included on the "China Rich List" for 2019.

In April 2020, Liu was in talks with the government of China regarding shipment of 5 million masks and 600,000 pairs of gloves for the COVID-19 relief efforts.

Early life and biography 
Liu Qiangdong was born on March 10, 1973, or February 14, 1974 in Suqian, Jiangsu province. His parents are in the business of shipping coal from north China to the south. As a young man, Liu Qiangdong had an interest in politics. He graduated from primary school in the Jiangsu province and enrolled in the department of sociology in the Renmin University of China 1992. However, finding the degree would not guarantee good job opportunities, Liu spent all his spare time learning computer programming. He graduated with a bachelor of laws in sociology in 1996, and later received an executive master of business administration from China Europe International Business School, Shanghai.

As a college student, Liu invested his income earned from programming work and family loans into a restaurant venture. The business failed in a few months, losing more than US$200,000, which left Liu in debt. After graduation, Liu was employed by Japan Life, a Japanese health product enterprise, and successively served as the director for computers, the director for business, and the logistics supervisor.

Career 
In June 1998, he started his own business Jingdong in Zhongguancun High-tech Industrial Park in Beijing as a distributor of magneto-optical products, focusing on selling authorized products when counterfeit products were widely sold. Upon foundation, Jingdong company was named after Liu Qiangdong himself and Gong Xiaojing, his then-girlfriend who also graduated from Renmin University of China. They broke up in 2003. Liu had opened 12 brick-and-mortar stores under the Jingdong brand by 2003.

The SARS outbreak in 2003 kept staff and clients of Jingdong at home and forced Liu to rethink the business model and divert to online business. Due to the outbreak, Liu's business lost over 8 million yuan. Liu launched his first online retail website in 2004, and founded JD.com (short form for Jingdong) later that year. In 2005, Liu closed off all brick-and-mortar stores and became an e-commerce business.

In 2005, Liu received an offer to sell JD.com for 18 million yuan, which he rejected.

In 2007, Liu employed a full-category strategy for JD.com, changing the company's business model from selling consumer electronics to large variety of goods. The company has become one of the leading e-commerce businesses in China. JD.com has been compared to Amazon because of similar business models, and Liu has been compared to Jeff Bezos as a self-made individual.

JD.com applied to go public in the US in January 2014. On 22 May 2014, the date of JD.com's IPO, the stock price rose about 15%

JD.com is the second largest internet-company in the world (by revenue) and is the largest e-commerce company in China.

In April 2022, JD.com announced that Liu is stepping down as CEO and will be replaced by Lei Xu, the company's current president.

Legal cases

On 23 July 2018, Liu Qiangdong was named as the billionaire host of a private dinner party in Sydney that was the focus of a rape trial. Party guest Xu Longwei was found guilty of seven charges, including having non-consensual sex with a woman he met at Liu's apartment on 26 December 2015. Liu was not charged with a crime or accused of any wrongdoing in that case. As a result, he asked for a suppression order from the Australian court to prevent the release of his name in connection with the case, a request which was rejected.

On August 31, 2018, Liu was arrested in Minneapolis, Minnesota, with the charge of rape. The complainant is a 21-year-old Chinese student who attended a dinner party with Liu on the night of August 30. After the party ended at 9:30 PM, the complainant and Liu returned to her apartment, where she alleges the rape occurred at 1:00 AM. Liu was released pending further investigation and returned to Beijing.

On September 2, 2018, JD.com issued a statement that the company would take legal action against "false reporting or rumors" after the local police found "no substance to the claim against Mr. Liu". Three American law firms have alleged that this statement was misleading and announced a class-action lawsuits in response. Liu's attorneys denied any wrongdoing and claimed that the charges are not supported by evidence.

On December 21, 2018, The office of the Hennepin County Attorney said they had not found enough evidence to charge Liu.

On April 16, 2019, Liu Jingyao, a student at the University of Minnesota, formally filed a civil lawsuit against Liu Qiangdong, claiming Liu forced himself upon her in his vehicle after the dinner and later raped her at her apartment. The lawsuit seeks damages of more than $50,000. In April 2020, the judge overseeing the case declined the motion to dismiss JD.com from the litigation; both the company and Liu are named defendants.

Personal life 
Liu Qiangdong has a son who was born in 2006. The name of the child's mother is not publicly known, Liu Qiangdong may have had a marriage with her.

In 2008, Liu volunteered as part of Red Cross efforts and drove to Pingwu County to help the victims of the Sichuan earthquake.

In August 2015, Liu, 41, married 22-year-old Zhang Zetian, an internet celebrity better known as "the Milk tea holding beauty". Their relationship started in early 2014 when Liu studied at Columbia University and Zhang was an exchange student at Barnard College, affiliated with Columbia University. Their early romance was spotted in New York City and when pictures were posted online. On April 10, 2014, Liu confirmed this relationship to the public through his Weibo account. On August 8, 2015, Liu Qiangdong and Zhang Zetian registered for marriage in Beijing. They held their wedding ceremony on October 1, 2015, in Sydney, Australia. Their daughter was born in March 2016.

Notes

References

External links
 
 

Living people
1973 births
People from Suqian
Businesspeople from Jiangsu
Billionaires from Jiangsu
Renmin University of China alumni
Columbia University alumni
JD.com people
21st-century Chinese businesspeople
Chinese online retailer founders
Chinese technology company founders
China Europe International Business School alumni
Members of the 13th Chinese People's Political Consultative Conference